
John Lang may refer to:

Sportspeople
John Lang (footballer, born 1881) (1881–1934), Scottish footballer
John Lang (footballer, born 1908), Scottish footballer
John Lang (Australian rugby league) (born 1950), Australian rugby league player and coach
John Lang (New Zealand rugby league) (1896–1971), New Zealand rugby league player

Musicians
John Lang (American musician) (born 1952), lyric writer for Mr. Mister and member of the band Djinn
John Lang (Rough Trade), Canadian musician with the band Rough Trade
Jonny Lang (born 1981), American blues and gospel musician

Others
John Dunmore Lang (1799–1878), Presbyterian clergyman and early advocate of Australian republicanism 
John Lang (Canadian politician) (1839–1921), former member of the Canadian House of Commons
Johnny Lang, historic Joshua Tree National Park cattle rancher and mining operator
John Lang (priest) (1927–2012), Anglican Dean of Lichfield
John Lang (sailor) (1794–?), sailor in the United States Navy
John Lang (writer) (1816–1864), said to be the first Australian-born novelist
John H. Lang (1899–1970), American who served with the Canadian Army and the United States Navy
Sir John Lang (1896–1984), British civil servant
John Lang (1972-Now), French writer, autor of the Dungeon of Naheulbeuk

See also
Jack Lang (disambiguation)
John Lange (disambiguation)
John Laing (disambiguation)